Zomi Colony is a town ward within Churachandpur district or Lamka town in the Indian state of Manipur. It has a very high concentration of ethnic Zou community. Both the headquarters of the Zou Synod Presbyterian Church and the Manipur Evangelical Lutheran Church are located within this locality.

References

Cities and towns in Churachandpur district
Geography of Manipur
Churachandpur